Brome may refer to:

People
Brome (surname)

Places
Brome, Suffolk, England
Brome (Samtgemeinde), an administrative district in Gifhorn, Lower Saxony, Germany
Brome, Germany, a municipality, seat of the Samtgemeinde

Canada
Brome, Quebec, a village
Brome County, Quebec, a historical county, abolished in the early 1980s
Brome (electoral district), a federal electoral district in Quebec from 1867 to 1925
Brome (provincial electoral district), a district in the Estrie region of Quebec from 1867 to 1972
Mont Brome, part of the Monteregian Hills in southern Quebec
Brome Lake, a lake in the county of Quebec

Other uses
Several species of grass, see Bromus
Brome, a character from the Redwall series by Brian Jacques

See also
The Brome play of Abraham and Isaac, a 15th-century Middle English play
 Brome and Oakley
 Bromont (disambiguation)
 Broom (disambiguation)
Broome (disambiguation)